Francis Irwin Burnell (1863 – March 18, 1926) was a one-term Republican mayor of Norwalk, Connecticut from 1913 to 1915. He was also mayor of South Norwalk from 1907 to 1909 prior to the consolidation of the two municipalities.

Early life 
Burnell was born in Pierstown, New York. He was raised in Otsego County, New York, and attended schools in Richfield Springs, New York.

He was the principal of the Hartwick Union school, and East End School at Oneonta, New York. He studied medicine at Long Island Medical College, and graduated in 1894. On February 26, 1895, he married Fanny Tripp of Mamaroneck, New York. Soon after his marriage, he took up graduate school at Polyclinic Hospital in New York City. He took up residence in Norwalk on September 28, 1895.

Political career 
In 1907, Burnell defeated Republican Matthew Corbett for mayor of South Norwalk. He served two one-year terms, and when South Norwalk and Norwalk were consolidated he was elected the first mayor of the consolidated city.

Associations 
 Member, Old Well Lodge Number 108 of Masons

References 

1863 births
1926 deaths
Physicians from New York City
Burials in Riverside Cemetery (Norwalk, Connecticut)
Connecticut Republicans
Deaths from pneumonia in Connecticut
Mayors of Norwalk, Connecticut
People from Otsego County, New York
Physicians from New York (state)
People from Armonk, New York
People from Oneonta, New York